Iowa Highway 117 is a north–south route in Jasper County. In addition to serving several communities directly, Highway 117 also provides a shortcut between U.S. Route 65 and Interstate 80 east of Des Moines.

Route description
Iowa Highway 117 begins at a partial cloverleaf interchange with Iowa 163 on the edge of Prairie City.  For its first mile (1.6 km), Iowa 117 runs west-to-east along Second Street, a former alignment of Iowa 163.  At its former southern end, State Street, it turns north approaching the center of town.  North of Prairie City, Iowa 117 travels due north for  until Colfax.

At Colfax, Iowa 117 turns west onto State Street.  Outside of Colfax, State Street is Jasper County Road F48, which connects Mitchellville and Newton.  After , the highway turns north towards downtown Colfax where it crosses an Iowa Interstate Railroad line and the South Skunk River.  One mile north of the river is a diamond interchange with Interstate 80 and U.S. Highway 6.

North of Colfax, Iowa 117 passes through rolling farmland with houses dotted along the road.  Three miles from Mingo, the highway begins curving to the north and west, parallel to Indian Creek.  The last four miles of Iowa 117 travel on creek bottoms, still adjacent to Indian Creek.  Just  from its northern end, Iowa 117 crosses Indian Creek one final time.  It ends an interchange with U.S. Highway 65 and Iowa Highway 330.  The dominant road is a four-lane expressway connecting Des Moines and Marshalltown.  North of the Iowa 117 intersection, the expressway is only Iowa 330 while to the south it is US 65 and Iowa 330.

History
Between July 1, 1920, and June 20, 1939, the road currently designated as Iowa Highway 117 was designated as Iowa Highway 64, while the original Iowa Highway 117 served as a highway between Anamosa and Sabula.  The two highway designations were swapped on June 20, 1939.  The highway originally extended northward to Colo until 1940, when the segment between the current northern terminus and Colo was replaced by US 65.

In 2002, the northern terminus intersection was reconstructed.  Previously, the roads which met at that point intersected one another at a sharp angle.  The 2002 reconstruction changed this so the involved highways intersected at right angles to each other.  This intersection was reconfigured again fifteen years later when an interchange was built about a mile north of the intersection.  The location of the interchange created some controversy because it was built on century farmland.

Major intersections

References

117
Transportation in Jasper County, Iowa
U.S. Route 65